Good Luck, Gentlemen is a 1992 Russian comedy film directed by Vladimir Bortko.

Plot 
Oleg goes to St. Petersburg with the hope of getting a good job and housing, but instead finds refuge in a forest in which former army captains majors live in tanks and his friend is engaged in private business. And suddenly they meet in provincial Olga, whom both fall in love with.

Cast 
 Nikolai Karachentsov as Vladimir
 Andrejs Zagars as Oleg (as Andrejs Zhagars)
 Darya Mikhaylova as Olga
 Tatyana Agafonova as Gipsy Masha
 Vladimir Bortko as The film director on shooting
 Boryslav Brondukov as Worker of a crematorium
 Semyon Furman as Businessman of shadow economy
 Yury Kuznetsov as Door-keeper
 Viktor Pavlov as Maksim Petrovich
 Yuriy Sherstnyov as Victor Ivanovich

References

External links 
 

1992 films
1990s Russian-language films
Russian comedy films
Films directed by Vladimir Bortko